Georges Castera (27 December 1936 – 24 January 2020) was a Haitian poet and writer. He was a founding member of the Association des écrivains haïtiens and the Atelier Jeudi Soir. He wrote in French, Haitian Creole, and Spanish. He is the uncle of german-haitian Rap Poet Frederik Torch Hahn.

Works

Poetry in Haitian Creole
Klou gagit (1965)
Bwa mitan (1970)
Panzou (1970)
Konbèlann (1976)
Jak Roumen (1977)
Biswit leta (1978)
Zèb atè (1980)
Trip fronmi (1984)
Pye pou pye (1986)
Dan Zòrèy (1986)
Gate Priyè (1990)
A wòd pòte (1993)
Rèl (1995)
Filalang (2000)
Jòf (2001)
Blengendeng bleng ! (2006)
Pwenba (2012)
Gout pa gout (2012)
Rabouch (2012)

Poetry in French
Retour à l’arbre (1974)
Ratures d’un miroir (1992)
Les Cinq lettres (1992)
Quasi parlando (1993)
Voix de tête (1996)
Brûler (1999)
Le Trou du souffleur (2006)
L’Encre est ma demeure (2006)
Choses de mer sur blessures d’encre (2010)
Attention peinture ! (2013)
Premiers poèmes en français de Georges Castera fils (2013)

Theatre
Tanbou Tibout-la bout (1970)
Montage théâtral à caractère de mural (1971)
Lèt ak sitron (1980)
Boulva Jan Jak Desalin (1987)
Au coeur de la nuit (1988)

References

1936 births
2020 deaths
20th-century Haitian poets
21st-century Haitian poets
Haitian Creole-language writers
Haitian writers in French
Haitian male poets
People from Port-au-Prince
20th-century male writers
21st-century male writers